The Solace System is the first EP by the Dutch symphonic metal band Epica. It features tracks originally supposed to be featured on the band's seventh album The Holographic Principle, released the previous year.

Track listing

Personnel
Credits for The Solace System adapted from liner notes.

Epica
Simone Simons – lead vocals, backing vocals
Mark Jansen – rhythm guitar, growled vocals
Isaac Delahaye – lead guitar, mandolin, balalaika, bouzouki, ukulele, orchestral toms, djembé, congas, bar chimes, tambourine, triangle
Coen Janssen – keyboards, synthesizer, piano, glockenspiel, xylophone, tubular bells, orchestral toms, gran casa, djembé, congas, finger cymbals, tambourine, additional samples and effects
Rob van der Loo – bass
Ariën van Weesenbeek – drums, additional grunts, orchestral snare drum, orchestral toms, timbales, congas, bongos (solo), cymbal a deux

Additional personnel
Marcela Bovio – backing vocals
Linda Janssen – backing vocals

Choir – Kamerkoor PA'dam 
Maria van Nieukerken – choir director
Martha Bosch, Ruth Becker, Silvia da Silva Martinho, Annemieke Klinkenberg-Nuijten, Alfrun Schmid, Dagmara Siuty, Guido Groenland, Joost van Velzen, Koert Braches, Matthijs Frankema, René Veen, Previn Moore, Annette Stallinga, Annette Vermeulen, Cécile Roovers, Natascha Morsink, Allard Veldman, Andreas Goetze, Angus van Grevenbroek, Jan Douwes

Production
Joost van den Broek – recording, mixing, mastering, orchestral arrangements, samples
Jacob Hansen – mixing, mastering
Stefan Heilemann – artwork
Jos Driessen – engineering, editing
Gjalt Lucassen – Latin translation
Jaap Toorenaar – Latin translation
Ben Mathot – scoring
Robin Assen – scoring

Epica Orchestra

Sabine Poiesz – violin
Ian de Jong – violin
Ben Mathot – violin
Floortje Beljon – violin
Loes Dooren – violin
Marieke de Bruijn – violin
Vera van der Bie – violin
Frank Goossens – viola
Mark Mulder – viola
Geneviève Verhage – celli
Eilidh Martin – celli
René van Munster – celli
Henk Veldt – French horn
Alex Thyssen – French horn
Paul Langerman – trombone
Lennart de Winter – trombone
Marnix Coster – trumpet
Jurgen van Nijnatten – trumpet
Thijs Dapper – oboe

Additional orchestra
Jeroen Goossens – flutes, bassoon
Igor Hobus – congas, djembe, goblet drum, gong, cymbal, tambourine
Jack Pisters – sitar
Maarten de Peijper – snare drum

Charts

References

2017 EPs
Epica (band) albums
Symphonic metal EPs
Nuclear Blast EPs